Brad Wood (born August 2, 1971) is a Canadian curler from Penticton, British Columbia.

Career
Wood has made four trips to the Tim Hortons Brier, all as alternate for Team British Columbia. His first appearance was in 2011 as alternate for Jim Cotter where BC finished in seventh place with a 4–7 record. His next trip was seven years later when he spared for the Sean Geall rink at the 2018 Tim Hortons Brier. Despite being listed as alternate, Wood played in every game for the team as lead David Harper and third Jeff Richard both had to leave the tournament at different points due to their wives expecting babies. The team finished in twelfth place with a 2–6 record. Wood was back the following year at the 2019 event once again sparing for Cotter. The team qualified for the championship pool with a 4–3 record before losing all four of their next matches, finishing in eighth place; once again with a 4–7 record. He made his fourth trip to the Brier in 2020 where Steve Laycock skipped the BC team but Jim Cotter threw fourth rocks. The team finished round robin play with a 2–5 record, missing the championship pool.

Personal life
Wood is the co-owner of Nufloors Penticton with his wife Annette Wood.

Teams

References

External links

1971 births
Living people
Canadian male curlers
Curlers from British Columbia
People from Nelson, British Columbia
Sportspeople from Penticton